The NWA Mid-Atlantic Heavyweight Championship was a professional wrestling championship promoted in Jim Crockett Promotions (JCP), a territory-promotion governed by the National Wrestling Alliance (NWA).

Title history

On October 13, 1970, the championship was introduced as the NWA Eastern Heavyweight Championship during a taping of Championship Wrestling. It was announced that the Missouri Mauler had defeated the defending champion Pat O'Connor in New York City to win the title; this title change was fictitious and a storyline to introduce the championship to the promotion; nevertheless, O'Connor's reign is denoted as the first official reign. Because it was fictitious, further information regarding O'Connor's reign is unavailable.

On the September 6, 1973 taping of Championship Wrestling, JCP owner Jim Crockett, Jr. announced the retirement of the NWA Eastern Heavyweight Championship and the establishment of the NWA Mid-Atlantic Heavyweight Championship. At the time of this change, Jerry Brisco was in his fourth reign as the NWA Eastern Heavyweight Champion, and as a result of never losing the title, he was recognized as the first NWA Mid-Atlantic Heavyweight Champion. Because Brisco's fourth reign did not end, being awarded the NWA Mid-Atlantic Heavyweight Title is not counted as a new reign overall in the title's history. By 1974, JCP was also known as "Mid-Atlantic Championship Wrestling" (MACW), which is why all of its championships included "Mid-Atlantic" in their names.

On December 26, 1986, Ron Garvin, after winning JCP's version of the NWA United States Tag Team Championship with Barry Windham, vacated the NWA Mid-Atlantic Heavyweight Championship and handed the belt to Crockett, Jr. on a taping of World Championship Wrestling. Crockett, Jr. deactivated the championship for unknown reasons, and eventually, JCP was sold to Ted Turner in 1988, thus becoming the new promotion, World Championship Wrestling. 

In the late 1990s, NWA gave a group of promoters permission to establish a territory called "Mid-Atlantic Championship Wrestling"; however, this territory has not claimed any connection to the original JCP/MACW. As a result, their prime championship, called the MACW Heavyweight Championship, has no connection to this original championship or its lineage.

Reigns

Overall, there were 63 reigns among 29 wrestlers. Fifteen of those reigns occurred while the title was called the "NWA Eastern Heavyweight Championship" while 46 reigns occurred under the "NWA Mid-Atlantic Heavyweight Championship" name. Johnny Valentine ranks first in combined reigns by the length of 504 days with 2 reigns total. Wahoo McDaniel had the most reigns with seven. Ken Patera's second reign was the longest in the title's history at 334 days. All title changes occurred at JCP–promoted events: live events, pay-per-view events, and on televised events that aired on broadcast delay.

Combined reigns

Key

See also
Jim Crockett Promotions alumni
NWA Worlds Heavyweight Championship
List of NWA World Heavyweight Champions

Footnotes

References
General (title history)

General (television programming)

Specific

External links
Mid-Atlantic Championship Wrestling/Jim Crockett Promotions history

Jim Crockett Promotions championships
National Wrestling Alliance championships
Regional professional wrestling championships